Claudio Adrián Cáceres (born 10 January 1982 in Buenos Aires) is an Argentine-born Australian former footballer who last played for Balcatta FC.

Club career
Caceres started his professional career with English team Southampton before spending a few years with lower Football League clubs including Yeovil Town, Hull City, Wycombe Wanderers, Brentford and Aldershot Town .

He moved back to Australia to play for Perth Glory for the second time in the inaugural A-League season. While putting in some good performances he was never a first team regular because of injury and moved to Melbourne Victory for the second A-League season, where he has reunited with former Perth Glory teammate, Mark Byrnes. The pair played together at Perth Glory, where they won National Soccer League (NSL) championship medals.

On 7 February 2008, Caceres signed a two-year deal with the Central Coast Mariners, which would start following the 2008 Asian Champions League.

In August 2009, Caceres was released from the final year of his two-year contract with the Central Coast Mariners by mutual consent. He was snapped up by the Wellington Phoenix just days later, and eventually scored his first goal for his new club on 18 December 2009 in a 1–1 draw with Adelaide United; however, this was later ruled to have been an own goal from goalkeeper Eugene Galekovic.

A-League career statistics 
Correct as of 20 August 2014

Personal life
On 18 March 2019 he was sentenced to 18 months' jail after being found guilty of dealing methamphetamine.

Honours
Melbourne Victory
A-League Championship: 2006–07
A-League Premiership: 2006–07
Perth Glory
NSL Championship: 2002–03, 2003–04

References

External links
 Wellington Phoenix profile
 Oz Football profile

1982 births
Living people
Footballers from Buenos Aires
Argentine emigrants to Australia
Australian soccer players
Australian expatriate soccer players
Southampton F.C. players
Brentford F.C. players
Hull City A.F.C. players
Perth Glory FC players
Yeovil Town F.C. players
Wycombe Wanderers F.C. players
Wellington Phoenix FC players
Expatriate association footballers in New Zealand
Aldershot Town F.C. players
Melbourne Victory FC players
A-League Men players
National Premier Leagues players
National Soccer League (Australia) players
English Football League players
National League (English football) players
Central Coast Mariners FC players
Indonesian Premier League players
Heidelberg United FC players
Adrian Caceres
Expatriate footballers in Thailand
Association football midfielders